Disneymania 3 is the third installment in the Disneymania album series presenting songs from Disney films, performed by various musical artists. The album was released on February 15, 2005 and was certified Gold soon after. It peaked at #30 on the Billboard 200, one spot behind its predecessor Disneymania 2.

Critical reception

Allmusic gave the album a rating of 3 stars out of 5, writing "As with all the Disneymania comps, the quality of the performances is all over the place, ranging from highlights like Bowling for Soup's cheeky, punky take on The Jungle Book's 'Bare Necessities' to missteps like Jesse McCartney's whiny version of 'When You Wish Upon a Star'...Like the volumes that came before it, Disneymania, Vol. 3 isn't perfect, but fans of Disney's current pop stars should find at least a few enjoyable moments here."

Track listing

Singles
"Under the Sea" - Raven-Symoné
"A Whole New World" - Jessica Simpson & Nick Lachey - released to promote Aladdin Platinum Edition
"I Won't Say (I'm in Love)" - The Cheetah Girls
"Zip-A-Dee-Doo-Dah" - Aly & AJ
"Cruella De Vil" - Lalaine
"Hawaiian Roller Coaster Ride" - Jump5, released to promote Lilo & Stitch 2: Stitch Has a Glitch

Music videos
"Under the Sea" - Raven-Symoné
"Hawaiian Roller Coaster Ride" - Jump5
"A Whole New World" - Jessica Simpson & Nick Lachey
"Part of Your World" - Skye Sweetnam
"Proud of Your Boy" - Clay Aiken
"Strangers Like Me" - Everlife

Disneymania 3 in Concert
Disneymania 3 in Concert was a live event held at Disney California Adventure on January 29 and 30, 2005. Prior to its DVD release, the concerts were broadcast on Music Choice via DirecTV in April 2005.
"Under the Sea" - Raven-Symoné (Originally from The Little Mermaid)
Introduction
Welcome from Raven
"Grazin' in the Grass" - Raven-Symoné (From The Lion King 1½)
Inside the Studio with Raven on "Under the Sea"
"It's a Small World" - Fan 3 (Originally from the 1964 New York World's Fair/Disneyland Attraction, It's a Small World)
"A Dream is a Wish Your Heart Makes" - Kimberly Locke (Originally from Cinderella)
"8th World Wonder" - Kimberly Locke
"Kiss the Girl" - Vitamin C (Originally from The Little Mermaid)
Inside the Studio with Lalaine on "Cruella de Vil"
"Cruella de Vil" - Lalaine (Originally from 101 Dalmatians)
Inside the Studio with Skye Sweetnam on "Part of Your World"*
Inside the Studio with Christy Carlson Romano on "Colors of the Wind"
"Colors of the Wind" - Christy Carlson Romano (Originally from Pocahontas)
"Strangers Like Me" - Everlife (Originally from Tarzan)
"Dive In" - Christy Carlson Romano
Inside the Studio with Aly & AJ on "Zip-a-Dee-Doo-Dah"
"Zip-A-Dee-Doo-Dah" - Aly & AJ (Originally from Song of the South)*
Inside the Studio with The Cheetah Girls on "I Won't Say (I'm in Love)"
"I Won't Say (I'm in Love)" - The Cheetah Girls (Originally from Hercules)

 Notice that Skye Sweetnam and Aly & AJ never actually take the stage.
 Lalaine also performed her single "I'm Not Your Girl", but the performance was omitted from the DVD release.

Chart positions

External links
 Disneymania Official site

References

Disneymania albums
Walt Disney Records compilation albums
2005 compilation albums